The New Covenant (Hebrew  ; Greek  diatheke kaine) is a biblical interpretation which was originally derived from a phrase which is contained in the Book of Jeremiah (Jeremiah 31:31–34), in the Hebrew Bible (or the Old Testament of the Christian Bible).

Generally, Christians believe that the promised New Covenant was instituted at the Last Supper as part of the Eucharist, which, in the Gospel of John, includes the New Commandment. Based on the biblical passage which reads that, "For where a testament is, there must also of necessity be the death of the testator. For a testament is of force after men are dead: otherwise it is of no strength at all while the testator liveth", Protestants tend to believe that the New Covenant only came into force with the death of Jesus Christ. The commentary to the Roman Catholic New American Bible also affirms that Christ is the "testator whose death puts his will into effect". Thus, Christians believe that Jesus is the mediator of the New Covenant, and they also believe that the blood of Christ, which was shed during his crucifixion, is the only blood sacrifice which is required by the covenant.

There are several Christian eschatologies that further define the New Covenant. For example, an inaugurated eschatology defines and describes the New Covenant as an ongoing relationship between Christian believers and God that will be in full fruition after the Second Coming of Christ; that is, it will not only be in full fruition in believing hearts, it will also be in fruition in the future external world. The description of the connection between the blood of Christ and the New Covenant is contained in most modern English translations of the New Testament such as the passage which reads: "this cup that is poured out for you is the new covenant in my blood".

Christianity

The key New Testament chapter for the Christian concept of the New Covenant is Hebrews chapter 8, a portion of which is quoted below:

That full quotation, with partial quotations of the same text in other New Testament passages, reflects that the authors of the New Testament and Christian leaders generally, consider Jeremiah 31:31–34 to be a central Old Testament prophecy of the New Covenant. Here is the key text:

Some Christians claim that there are many other passages that speak about the same New Covenant without using this exact wording. Some passages speak of a "covenant of peace", others use other constructions; some simply say "covenant", but the context may imply that the New Covenant is at issue; and some claim metaphorical descriptions, for example that "Mount Zion" is really a metaphor for the New Covenant.

New Testament texts
The occurrence of the phrase "new covenant" varies in English translations of the Greek New Testament.

Luke 22:17–20 (part of the Last Supper) is disputed. Six forms of the text have been identified; for example, the Western text-type such as Codex Bezae omit verses 19b–20.

The Daniel 9:27 commentary found in the 1599 Geneva Bible connects the verse with the New King James Version translation of Matthew 26:28. In this interpretation, the angel Gabriel reveals the coming New Blood Covenant of the Messiah, which is the fulfillment of the promise that through Abraham's seed all the nations would be blessed. (Galatians 3:16, 26–29)

Christian view
Christians view the New Covenant as a new relationship between God and humans mediated by Jesus upon sincere declaration that one believes in Jesus Christ as Lord and God. Some Protestant theologians teach that the New Covenant also breaks the generational curse of original sin on all children of Adam if they believe in Jesus Christ, after people are judged for their own sins, which is expected to happen with the Second Coming of Jesus Christ.

Most historic Christian Churches, including the Roman Catholic Church, Methodist Churches and Reformed Churches, have traditionally held that law in the Old Covenant has three components: ceremonial, moral, and civil (cf. covenant theology). They teach that while the ceremonial and civil (judicial) laws have been abolished, the moral law as contained in the Ten Commandments still continues to bind Christian believers.

Dispensationalist theology, taught by certain denominations such as the Plymouth Brethren, present a view of the nature of Israel is that God's promises to Israel are distinct from the Church. The Church, in this present age, is in no way a "spiritual Israel". Some Christians, however, believe that the Church has inherited and absorbed God's promises to Israel, and that Israel is primarily a spiritual nation composed of Jews who claim Jesus as their Messiah, as well as Gentile believers who through the New Covenant have been grafted into the promises made to Israelites. This spiritual Israel is based on the faith of the patriarch Abraham (before he was circumcised) who was ministered by the Melchizedek priesthood, which is understood to be a type for the Christian faith of believing Jesus to be Christ and Lord in the order of Melchizedek. The Apostle Paul says that it is not "the children of the flesh" who are the children of God, but "the children of the promise". While Christ came as a priest in the order of Melchizedeck, which is to say without precedence, and fulfilled God's promise of a Messiah to the entire world whosoever believes, Dispensationalists believe that the body of God's promises concerning the future of Israel were to Israel alone, and should not be interpreted as being superimposed on the Church in the present age. God's remaining promises to Israel will come to fruition in the Millennium, the 1,000 year reign of Christ on Earth.

Membership
Among Christians, there are significant differences on the question of membership in the New Covenant.  These differences can be so serious that they form a principal reason for division i.e., denominationalism.  Christian denominations exist because of their answer to this question.  The first major split is between those who believe that only believers are members of the New Covenant, and (reflecting the idea of the Jewish covenants as national or community covenants) those who believe that believers and their children are members of the New Covenant.

These differences give rise to different views on whether children may be baptised: the credobaptist view and the paedobaptist view. Secondarily, there are differences among paedobaptists as to the nature of the membership of children in the covenant.

Knowledge of God
Another difference is between those who believe the New Covenant has already substantially arrived (Preterists), and that this knowledge of God that the member of the New Covenant has is primarily salvific knowledge; and those that believe that the New Covenant has not yet substantially arrived, but will in the Second Coming, and that this knowledge is more complete knowledge, meaning a member of the New Covenant no longer has to be taught anything at all regarding the Christian life (not just that they lack need for exhortation regarding salvific reconciliation with God).

This division does not just break down along Jewish v. Christian lines (as the previous difference did).  In general, those that are more likely to lean toward the "already view", or "salvific knowledge view", are those Christians that do not believe in the indivisible Church (the indivisible Church is a belief of Catholics and Orthodox) and Christians that practice believer's baptism, because both believe the New Covenant is more present reality than future reality.  Also in general, those that lean toward the "not yet view", or "complete knowledge view", practice infant baptism for covenantal reasons, and dispensationalistic Christians (even though they tend to practice believer's baptism), because they believe the New Covenant is more future reality than present reality.

Christian supersessionism

Supersessionism is the view that the New Covenant replaces, fulfills or completes God's prior covenants with the Israelites. The most common alternatives to Supersessionism are abrogation of old covenant laws and dual covenant theology.

Writers who reject the notion of supersessionism include Michael J. Vlach, Walter Brueggemann, Roland Edmund Murphy, and Jacques B. Doukhan.

Judaism

The only reference in the Hebrew Bible that uses the wording "new covenant" is found in :

This prophet's word refers to the Messianic Age to come (or World to come), in which the eternal Mosaic covenant with Israel will be confirmed. Of this Mosaic covenant between God and Israel the Shabbat is declared to be the sign forever. The Tanakh describes Shabbat as having the purpose as a "taste" of Olam Haba (the world to come, the Hereafter) following the Messianic Age (the End of Days).

The Jewish view of the mere wording "new covenant" is no more than a renewed national commitment to abide by God's laws. In this view, the word new does not refer to a new commitment that replaces a previous one, but rather to an additional and greater level of commitment.

Because Jews view the Mosaic covenant as applying only to Jews and any New Covenant merely a strengthening of the already existing one, Jews do not see this phrase as relevant in any way to non-Jews. For non-Jews, Judaism advocates the pre-Sinaitic Seven Laws of Noah. "Unlike Christianity, Judaism does not deny salvation to those outside of its fold, for, according to Jewish law, all non-Jews who observe the Noahide laws will participate in salvation and in the rewards of the world to come".

In his 1962 work The Prophets, Abraham Joshua Heschel points out that prophecy is not the only instrument of God to change the hearts of Israel, to know that he is God. He tells how the prophet Jeremiah complains that Israel is circumcised in body but "uncircumcised in heart" (9:26), that Jeremiah says "wash your heart from wickedness" (4:14). Heschel analyses that, while the prophet can only give Israel a new word, it is God himself who will give man a new heart: The "new covenant" will accomplish the complete transformation of every individual.

Compare with:

The Jewish Encyclopedias "New Testament" article states:

Brit also has the numeric value of 612, which is suggested by some to mean that it is the "first" mitzvah which is true for the Jewish life cycle. The other use is in relationship to the merit of Ruth being an ancestor to King David, with the name again having same gematria as Brit, linking Davidic covenant with that of all previous, since Ruth was a Moabite by birth, and related to Noah also.

Islam
The Quran mentions that God has made a new covenant of sorts with the Christians but they "neglected part of it" and were consequently punished for that.

See also
 Christian Torah-submission
 Christian views on the Old Covenant
 Christianity and Judaism
 Expounding of the Law
 Jewish Christian
 Judaizers
 Law of Christ
 Messiah in Judaism
 New Covenant theology
 New Testament#Etymology
 New Wine into Old Wineskins
 Pauline Christianity

References

External links
 Catholic Encyclopedia: Epistle to the Hebrews: "... the Epistle opens with the solemn announcement of the superiority of the New Testament Revelation by the Son over Old Testament Revelation by the prophets. It then proves and explains from the Scriptures the superiority of this New Covenant over the Old by the comparison of the Son with the angels as mediators of the Old Covenant, with Moses and Josue as the founders of the Old Covenant, and, finally, by opposing the high-priesthood of Christ after the order of Melchisedech to the Levitical priesthood after the order of Aaron."
 The Jewish Encyclopedia: Covenant: The Old and the New Covenant
 The New Covenant: Does It Abolish God's Laws?
 New Covenant Collection Articles by Ray Stedman

1st-century Christianity
Biblical law
Biblical phrases
Book of Jeremiah
Christian eschatology
Christian terminology
Christianity and Judaism related controversies
Christology
Covenants in the Hebrew Bible
Doctrines and teachings of Jesus
Judaism in the New Testament
Mosaic law in Christian theology
New Testament theology
Supersessionism